Plaine-du-Nord is a commune in the Acul-du-Nord Arrondissement, in the Nord department of Haiti. It has 28,544 inhabitants.

Communal Sections 
The commune consists of four communal sections, namely:
 Morne Rouge, rural
 Basse Plaine, urban (town of Plaine-du-Nord) and rural
 Grand Boucan, urban (Robillard neighborhood) and rural
 Bassin Diamant, rural

Notable people 
Bermane Stiverne (Born 1978) – former WBC heavyweight world champion.

References

Populated places in Nord (Haitian department)
Communes of Haiti